MIL-STD-1397 standard was issued by the United States Department of Defense (DoD) to define "the requirements for the physical, functional and electrical characteristics of a standard I/O data interface for digital data." The MIL-STD-1397 classification types A, B and D apply specifically to the Naval Tactical Data System (NTDS).

Overview

Types 
MIL-STD-1397 defines several 'Types' (A to K) 
 Type A (NTDS Slow)- Parallel data transfer of up to 41667 words per second on one cable.
 Type B (NTDS Fast) - Parallel data transfer of up to 250000 words per second on one cable.
 Type C (ANEW) - Parallel data transfer of up to 250000 words per second on one cable.
 Type D (NTDS Serial) - Asynchronous serial data transfer using 10 Mbit/s data rate.
 Type E (NATO Serial) - Asynchronous serial data transfer at 10Mbit/s, with 300000 words/sec in burst mode, or 175000 words/sec in single transfer mode. Type E is derived from STANAG 4153. Type E uses Bi-Phase Modulation [Manchester II phase encoding]. The impedance is 50 ohms + 5 ohms, a 50 ohm Triaxial cable is defined [center conductor is the signal, the other two are shields]. MIL-C-17/134 cable is used for lengths up to 120 meters, MIL-C-17/135 is used for cable lengths up to 300 meters. The connectors are defined by MIL-C-49142 /01 and /02.
 Type F - MIL-STD-1553 aircraft Manchester Byphase multiplex serial bus, 1 Mbit/s data rate.
 Type G (RS-449 compatible with RS-232) - uses EIA449 / EIA232 implementation.
 Type H (High Speed) - Parallel data transfer of up to 500,000 words per second on one cable.
 Type I - Not specified.
 Type J - Optical version
 Type K (SCSI) - Based on SCSI-2.

Mechanical
Type D uses BNC coaxial connectors.
Type E uses TNC triaxial connectors.

Electrical Signalling
 Type A - Binary voltage levels of 0 VDC (logic 1) and -15 VDC (logic 0)
 Type B - Binary voltage levels of 0 VDC (logic 1) and -3 VDC (logic 0)
 Type C - Binary voltage levels of 0 VDC (logic 1) and +3.5 VDC (logic 0) 
 Type D - Bipolar +/- 3.25 VDC nominal
 Type E - Bipolar +/- 600mv
 Type F -
 Type G - 
 Type H -
 Type I - Not specified.
 Type J -

References
 Military Standard, Input/Output Interfaces, Standard Digital Data, Navy Systems (MIL-STD-1397B), 3 March 1989

External links
 MIL-STD-1397 and NTDS (Retrieved 14 October 2009)

Military of the United States standards